Pogonopoma obscurum is a species of armored catfish endemic to Brazil where it occurs in the upper reaches of the Uruguay River, in the states of Rio Grande do Sul and Santa Catarina, southern Brazil. This species is fairly common and inhabits stretches of the main river and its tributaries, with relatively rapid water currents over bottoms usually formed by rocks and boulders.  This species grows to a length of  SL.

References
 

Hypostominae
Fish of South America
Fish of Brazil
Endemic fauna of Brazil
Fish described in 2002